Josephine Adams Rathbone (September 10, 1864 – May 17, 1941) was a librarian, library educator, author, and president of the American Library Association in 1931–32.  She was born in Jamestown, New York. She began her studies at the University of Michigan from 1887 to 1891, then moved to New York where she graduated from the New York State Library School in 1893 earning a B.L.S.
After working for two years as an assistant cataloger at the Pratt Institute Free Library she was appointed "chief instructor" at the Pratt Institute Library School in 1895 under Mary Wright Plummer. When Plummer went to the New York Public Library to establish its Training Class in 1911, Rathbone was appointed vice-director of the Pratt Institute school, a position she held until she retired in 1938.

Rathbone was active in state and local professional associations serving as secretary of the New York State Library Association and president of the New York Library Club. In 1931-1932 she was president of the American Library Association (ALA).

Bibliography
Libraries to See in Greater New York Wisconsin Library Bulletin, Volume 12. February, 1916. pages 53–58
Viewpoints in Travel; An Arrangement of Books According to Their Essential Interest. Chicago: American library Association Pub. board, 1919.
Shelf Department. Chicago: American Library Association Pub. board, 1918.

References

 

American librarians
American women librarians
Presidents of the American Library Association
1864 births
1941 deaths
University of Michigan alumni